The North Water  is a 2021 five-part television miniseries based on Ian McGuire's 2016 novel of the same name directed by Andrew Haigh and starring Colin Farrell and Jack O'Connell. An international co-production between British public broadcaster BBC, and Canadian English-language public broadcaster CBC Television, in association with Canadian premium television channel Super Channel and CBC Television's French-language counterpart ICI Radio-Canada Télé,  the series first premiered in the United States on AMC+ on 15 July 2021 before premiering in the United Kingdom on BBC Two on 10 September 2021 and in Canada on Super Channel Fuse a week later on 19 September, followed by a nationwide broadcast in the country on CBC Television in English and ICI Radio-Canada Télé in French, with video on demand availability on the CBC Gem and ICI TOU.TV services in both respective languages.

Premise
The series describes a mid-19th-century whaling expedition in the Arctic. On board the vessel are Patrick Sumner, the ship's surgeon and a man with a past, and Henry Drax, a harpooner and a thug. As well as whaling, the series depicts the slaughter of seals, and rape and murder aboard the ship. The ship's captain has conspired with its owner to sink the vessel for insurance purposes, but when it goes down, the ship that was supposed to rescue the crew is unable to reach them. As the men die one by one, Sumner is forced to battle not only the elements, but also the murderous Drax.

Cast
Jack O'Connell as Patrick Sumner
Colin Farrell as Henry Drax
Stephen Graham as Captain Arthur Brownlee
Tom Courtenay as Baxter
Sam Spruell as Michael Cavendish
Peter Mullan as the Priest
Roland Møller as Otto
Kieran Urquhart as Jones
Philip Hill-Pearson as McKendrick
Nive Nielsen as Anna
Jonathan Aris as Corbyn
Lee Knight as Stevens
Gary Lamont as Webster
Eliza Butterworth as Hester
Mark Rowley as Bain
Keenan Carpenter as Merok

Episodes

Production
The series first began development in late 2016. Canadian public broadcaster CBC/Radio-Canada and premium television channel Super Channel joined on board as co-producers of the series.

It was announced in February 2019 that Colin Farrell had been cast to star in the miniseries. Jack O'Connell was added in April. with Stephen Graham, Tom Courtenay and Peter Mullan amongst additional cast announced. Filming of the drama started in October 2019, in Hungary and on the Norwegian archipelago of Svalbard (Spitzbergen), with the production team journeying north as far as 81 degrees, to shoot pack ice sequences, which is purported to be the furthest point north any television drama has ever been filmed.

In May 2019, Canadian composer and sound artist Tim Hecker announced that he had been hired as the show's composer.

In March 2020, filming had to be paused when quite close to wrapping, due to the COVID-19 pandemic. The remaining four days of filming were completed at a later date, at a studio in the United Kingdom.

Reception
The North Water has received positive reviews from critics. On Rotten Tomatoes, the series holds an approval rating of 95% based on 19 critic reviews, with an average rating of 7.40/10. The website's critical consensus reads, "The North Waters story doesn't always hold together, but its brooding atmosphere and strong performances from Jack O'Connell and Colin Farrell keep it afloat." On Metacritic, it has a score of 74 out of 100 based on 13 critics, indicating "generally favourable reviews".

The series received a Canadian Screen Award nomination for Best Dramatic Series at the 10th Canadian Screen Awards in 2022.

See also
The Terror, a similar TV series albeit of the supernatural horror genre is set aboard a ship stranded in the Arctic pack ice during the Franklin expedition of 1846

References

External links

2021 British television series debuts
2021 British television series endings
2020s British television miniseries
2020s British drama television series
Fiction set in 1859
Television series set in the 1850s
BBC high definition shows
BBC television dramas
English-language television shows
Television productions suspended due to the COVID-19 pandemic
Television shows based on British novels
Television shows filmed in Hungary
Television shows set in the Arctic
Whaling
2021 Canadian television series debuts
2021 Canadian television series endings
2020s Canadian drama television series
2020s Canadian television miniseries
CBC Television original programming